Sir James Buller East, 2nd Baronet (1 February 1789 – 19 November 1878) was a British barrister.

East, eldest son of Sir Edward Hyde East, was born in Bloomsbury, London, on 1 February 1789. He was educated at Harrow and at Christ Church, Oxford, where he proceeded B.A. in 1810, M.A. in 1824, and was created a Doctor of Civil Law on 13 June 1834. He was called to the bar of the Inner Temple on 5 February 1813, became a bencher of his inn on 15 January 1856, and reader in 1869. He succeeded his father as second baronet on 8 January 1847.

As a conservative, he sat for Winchester from 30 July 1831 to 3 December 1832, when he was defeated, and from 10 January 1835 to 10 February 1864. He was a justice of the peace and deputy-lieutenant for Gloucestershire, and a magistrate for Oxfordshire.

He died at Bourton House, near Moreton-in-Marsh, Gloucestershire, on 19 November 1878 and left £70,000 in his will. He married, 27 June 1822, Caroline Eliza, second daughter of James Henry Leigh, and sister of Chandos Leigh, 1st Baron Leigh. She was born on 12 June 1794, and died on 7 April 1870.

References

External links
 

1789 births
1878 deaths
People from Bloomsbury
People educated at Harrow School
Alumni of Christ Church, Oxford
Members of the Inner Temple
Baronets in the Baronetage of the United Kingdom
Tory MPs (pre-1834)
Conservative Party (UK) MPs for English constituencies
UK MPs 1831–1832
UK MPs 1835–1837
UK MPs 1837–1841
UK MPs 1841–1847
UK MPs 1847–1852
UK MPs 1852–1857
UK MPs 1857–1859
UK MPs 1859–1865
Deputy Lieutenants of Gloucestershire